Marennes may refer to two communes in France:
Marennes, Charente-Maritime, in the Nouvelle-Aquitaine region
Marennes, Rhône, in the Auvergne-Rhône-Alpes region